KFFM (107.3 FM) is a radio station broadcasting a Top 40 (CHR) format. The station is licensed to Yakima, Washington, United States. The station is currently owned by Townsquare Media.

Tower and coverage area
KFFM's tower is located slightly northeast of Yakima. Their signal reaches Cle Elum, Ellensburg, Wenatchee and Moses Lake, Washington.

DJs
Baby Joel and Reesha in the Morning, Rik Mikals, John Riggs, D-Rez, Ryan Seacrest, Kid Kelly

References

External links
KFFM official website
 Flash Stream, MP3 Stream

FFM
Townsquare Media radio stations
Contemporary hit radio stations in the United States